Süslü Sokak (Ornamented street in Turkish) is a renowned street in the Mebusevleri neighborhood of Çankaya  district in Ankara. It is one of the few streets in Ankara featuring the characteristics of the early Republican era, which is, however,  jeopardized by the construction of modern buildings today.

The neighborhood Mebusevleri (Houses of the Members of the Parliament) was built in the 1930s to provide housing for the members of the Turkish Parliament.

Süslü Sokak is situated just 50 meters below Anıtkabir, the mausoleum of Atatürk.

Streets in Ankara

tr:Mebusevleri#Süslü Sokak